

A09A Digestives, including enzymes

A09AA Enzyme preparations
A09AA01 Diastase
A09AA02 Multienzymes (lipase, protease, etc.)
A09AA03 Pepsin
A09AA04 Tilactase

A09AB Acid preparations
A09AB01 Glutamic acid hydrochloride
A09AB02 Betaine hydrochloride
A09AB03 Hydrochloric acid
A09AB04 Citric acid

A09AC Enzyme and acid preparations, combinations
A09AC01 Pepsin and acid preparations
A09AC02 Multienzymes and acid preparations

References

A09